Jungnang B is a constituency of the National Assembly of South Korea. The constituency consists of part of Jungnang District, Seoul. As of 2016, 192,315 eligible voters were registered in the constituency.

List of members of the National Assembly

Recent election results

2016

2012

References 

Constituencies of the National Assembly (South Korea)